SwiftCarbon Pro Cycling are a former British professional road bicycle racing team who participated in elite races. The team was registered as UCI Continental for the 2019 season until the 2021 season. The team disbanded at the end of the 2021 season due to a lack of sponsorship.

Team roster

References

External links

Cycling teams established in 2018
UCI Continental Teams (Europe)
Cycling teams based in the United Kingdom